Stemonitis splendens, commonly known as the chocolate tube slime, is a species of slime mold.

Description

Fruiting body
The sporangia are dark purplish brown, smooth, dry, 10–20 mm tall, and 1–2 mm in diameter. The stem is black, 3–5 mm long, and less than 1 mm thick.

Spore
The spores are 6–9 µm in diameter, brown, globose, and covered in small warts.

Ecology and distribution
Specimens grow in small, compact clusters on sheltered, decaying wood. It is quite common within its range. In Australia the species has been observed in all states.

References

Myxogastria